Hot Christian Songs is a music chart published weekly by Billboard magazine in the United States. It ranks the popularity of Christian songs using the same methodology developed for the Billboard Hot 100, the magazine's flagship songs chart, by incorporating data from the sales of downloads, streaming data, and airplay across all monitored radio stations.

From its inception in June 2003 through November 2013, the Hot Christian Songs chart ranked the top songs only by overall audience impressions of songs played on contemporary Christian music radio stations. Beginning with the chart dated December 7, 2013, the chart follows the same methodology used for the Hot 100 to compile its rankings. The Christian Airplay chart was created in unison with the change to continue to monitor airplay of songs on Christian radio.

As of the issue dated March 18, 2023 the current number-one single is "Gratitude" by Brandon Lake.

Song milestones

Most weeks at number one
16 songs have spent fifteen weeks or longer at number one. These are:

Source:

Most total weeks on chart
32 songs have spent 52 weeks or longer on the charts. These are:
"Oceans (Where Feet May Fail)" – Hillsong UNITED (191 weeks)
"You Say" - Lauren Daigle (160 weeks)
"What a Beautiful Name" - Hillsong Worship (81 weeks)
"O Come to the Altar" - Elevation Worship (74 weeks)
"Word of God Speak" – MercyMe (72 weeks)
"Blessed Be Your Name" – tree63 (68 weeks)
"Reckless Love" - Cory Asbury (68 weeks)
"Where I Belong" – Building 429 (63 weeks)
"You Are My King (Amazing Love)" – Newsboys (63 weeks)
"God Only Knows" - for King & Country (62 weeks)
"More" – Matthew West (60 weeks)
"10,000 Reasons (Bless the Lord)" – Matt Redman (59 weeks)
"By Your Side" – Tenth Avenue North (58 weeks)
"Who You Say I Am" - Hillsong Worship (58 weeks)
"Trust in You" - Lauren Daigle (57 weeks)
"Graves into Gardens" - Elevation Worship featuring Brandon Lake (57 weeks)
"Who Am I" – Casting Crowns (56 weeks)
"There Will Be a Day" – Jeremy Camp (55 weeks)
"(There's Gotta Be) More to Life" – Stacie Orrico (55 weeks)
"Redeemed" – Big Daddy Weave (54 weeks)
"Rescue" - Lauren Daigle (54 weeks)
"Lord, I Need You" – Matt Maher featuring Audrey Assad (52 weeks)
"You Are I Am" – MercyMe (52 weeks)
"God's Not Dead (Like a Lion)" – Newsboys (52 weeks)
"One Thing Remains" – Passion featuring Kristian Stanfill (52 weeks)
"Need You Now (How Many Times)" – Plumb (52 weeks)
"Lead Me" – Sanctus Real (52 weeks)
"My Hope Is in You" – Aaron Shust (52 weeks)
"Whom Shall I Fear (God of Angel Armies)" – Chris Tomlin (52 weeks)
"The Motions" – Matthew West (52 weeks)
"Chain Breaker - Zach Williams (52 weeks)
"Even If" - MercyMe (52 weeks)
"So Will I (100 Billion X)" - Hillsong UNITED (52 weeks)
"Resurrecting" - Elevation Worship (52 weeks)

Number-one debuts
Seventeen songs have debuted at number one without having previously entered the chart. These are:

 Matthew West – "More" (March 27, 2004)
 Carrie Underwood – "Something in the Water" (October 18, 2014)
 Meghan Linsey - "Amazing Grace" (May 23, 2015)
 Jordan Smith - "Great Is Thy Faithfulness" (December 5, 2015)
 Jordan Smith - "Hallelujah" (December 19, 2015)
 Braiden Sunshine - "Amazing Grace" (December 26, 2015)
 Jordan Smith - "Mary, Did You Know?" (December 19, 2015)
 Sundance Head - "Me and Jesus" (December 17, 2016)
 Christian Cuevas - "To Worship You I Live (Away)" (December 24, 2016)
 Lecrae  - "I'll Find You" (July 1, 2017)
 NF - "Let You Down" (October 7, 2017)
 Brooke Simpson - "Amazing Grace" (December 23, 2017)
 Brooke Simpson - "O Holy Night" (January 3, 2018)
 TobyMac - "I Just Need U." (January 20, 2018)
 Kanye West - "Follow God" (November 9, 2019)
 Kanye West  - "Wash Us in the Blood" (July 11, 2020)
 Kanye West - "Hurricane" (September 11, 2021)
 DJ Khaled and Kanye West faturing Eminem - "Use This Gospel" remix (September 10, 2022)

Biggest jump to number one

 33–1 – Lauren Daigle - "You Say" (July 28, 2018)
 21–1 – Hillsong UNITED - "Oceans (Where Feet May Fail)" (December 7, 2013)
 17–1 – Reba McEntire & Lauren Daigle - "Back To God" (February 18, 2017)
 13–1 – Third Day - "Cry Out To Jesus" (January 14, 2006)
 12–1 – Steven Curtis Chapman - "Christmas Time Again" (December 29, 2012)
 12–1 – Big Daddy Weave - "Redeemed" (January 12, 2013)
 10–1 – Chris Tomlin - "Made To Worship" (January 13, 2007)
 10–1 – Josh Wilson - "Jesus Is Alive" (January 7, 2012)
 8–1 – Sundance Head - "Me And Jesus" (December 31, 2016)
 7–1 – Aaron Shust - "O Come, O Come Emmanuel" (January 6, 2007)

Longest climbs to number one

 46th week – Elevation Worship featuring Brandon Lake – "Graves into Gardens" (2020–21)
 45th week – Elevation Worship featuring Jonsal Barrientes – "Same God" (2022–23)
 42nd week – Phil Wickham – "House of the Lord" (2021–22)
 35th week – Maverick City Music featuring Joe L. Barnes and Naomi Raine – "Promises" (2021-22)
 34th week – Jeremy Camp – "Let It Fade" (2007–08)

Biggest drop from number one

 1–46 – Matthew West featuring Amy Grant  - "Give This Christmas Away" (January 16, 2010)
 1–45 – Sundance Head - "Me And Jesus" (January 7, 2017)
 1–44 – Josh Wilson - "Jesus Is Alive" (January 14, 2012)
 1–37 – Braiden Sunshine - "Amazing Grace" (January 2, 2016)
 1–33 – MercyMe - "Joseph's Lullaby" (January 14, 2006)
 1–30 – Brooke Simpson - "O Holy Night" (January 6, 2018)
1–24 – Anne Wilson - "My Jesus" (September 11, 2021)
 1–20 – Meghan Linsey - "Amazing Grace" (May 30, 2015)
 1–14 – Brooke Simpson - "Amazing Grace" (December 30, 2017)
 1–13 – Steven Curtis Chapman - "Christmas Time Again" (January 12, 2013)

Artist achievements

Most number-one singles

Source:

Most cumulative weeks at number one
12 artists have spent thirty weeks or longer at number one. These are:

Most top ten hits

Source:

Most charted hits

Artists who reached No. 1 in at least two decades
Three
tobyMac (2000s, 2010s, 2020s)
Matthew West (2000s, 2010s, 2020s)
Big Daddy Weave (2000s, 2010s, 2020s)
Two
Aaron Shust (2000s, 2010s)
Brandon Heath (2000s, 2010s)
Building 429 (2000s, 2010s)
Casting Crowns (2000s, 2010s)
Chris Tomlin (2000s, 2010s)
Jeremy Camp (2000s, 2010s)
MercyMe (2000s, 2010s)
Needtobreathe (2000s, 2010s)
Third Day (2000s, 2010s)
Lauren Daigle (2010s, 2020s)
Kanye West (2010s, 2020s)
Carrie Underwood (2010s, 2020s)

Album achievements

Most number-one singles from one album

Other achievements
 The longest gap between No. 1 hits on Hot Christian Songs for an artist is 7 years, 10 months, 2 days by Building 429. Their single "Where I Belong" hit No. 1 on March 10, 2012, their first time on top since "Glory Defined" on May 8, 2004.
 MercyMe holds the record gap between first and most recent No. 1 on the Hot Christian Songs over the longest period of time: 14 years, 7 months, and 22 days. The first of twenty-three weeks at No. 1 for "Word of God Speak" by MercyMe was August 16, 2003. The last week at No. 1 for "I Can Only Imagine" was April 7, 2018, after it re-entered the charts to coincide with the release of the film of the same title.
 The record for the longest wait from an artist's Hot Christian Songs debut entry to its first No. 1 belongs to Skillet, with 10 years, 2 months, 10 days between the time they first cracked the Hot Christian Songs chart with "Rebirthing" (October 28, 2006) and the first of one week at No. 1 with "Feel Invincible" (January 7, 2017).
 Kanye West is the only artist to occupy the entire top 10 at once and he has done it twice. 
 Reba McEntire (age 60 years) is the oldest artist to top the chart. Her cover of "Back to God" topped the chart on February 18, 2017.
 Anne Wilson (age 19 years) is the youngest artist to top the chart. Her song "My Jesus" topped the chart on August 14, 2021.
 Danny Gokey has the most entries on the chart without achieving a number one hit (21).
Jordan Smith became the first male artist to replace himself at number one on the chart; Smith's cover of "Hallelujah" dethroned his cover of "Great Is Thy Faithfulness" on December 19, 2015. Carrie Underwood became the first female artist, when her John Legend collaboration of "Hallelujah" replaced her song "Favorite Time of Year" on December 26, 2021.

References

External links
Current Hot Christian Songs chart

Billboard charts
Contemporary Christian music